Jade Tailor is an American actress. She is known for her regular role as Kady in the Syfy television series The Magicians (2015–2020), and for starring in the 2018 film Higher Power.

Career
In 2010, she portrayed the lead role in Karma, an Indian Telugu-language film directed by Adivi Sesh. Regarding her performance, a critic noted that "Jade Tailor should be complimented for acting in a Telugu film. She did her best to fit into a film dealing with Indian mythology".

Tailor also played recurring characters in the TNT series Murder in the First, and the NBC series Aquarius opposite David Duchovny. Tailor has also guest starred on Vegas and True Blood.

In film, Tailor portrayed the role of Heather Steadman in the 2018 film Higher Power, a science fiction thriller about a regular person who acquires the power of a demigod. She also starred in the thrillers Cam2Cam in 2014 and Altered Perception in 2017.

From 2015 to 2020, Tailor played Kady in the SyFy television series The Magicians, based on Lev Grossman's book trilogy, and was promoted to main character status starting with the series' second season.

Personal life 
Her father is Israeli and she speaks Hebrew.  Her American mother, Sally Pansing Kravich, was a former figure skater and an actress in the 1970s, and her brother is an attorney.

Filmography

Film

Television

References

External links

Living people
American actresses
American people of Israeli descent
Year of birth missing (living people)
21st-century American women